Events from the year 1683 in Taiwan.

Incumbents

Events
 8 July — after extensive preparation, Shi Lang led a force of 300 warships and 20,000 soldiers out of Tongshan, Fujian.
 5 September - Shi Lang received Zheng Keshuang's offer to surrender.
 3 October - Shi Lang reached Taiwan and formally obtained the capitulation of Liu Guoxuan and Zheng Keshuang.

Births

References

 
Years of the 17th century in Taiwan